Ai is an unincorporated community in Person County, North Carolina, United States. Ai is home to Antioch Baptist Church.

References 

Unincorporated communities in North Carolina
Unincorporated communities in Person County, North Carolina